James Wilson „Champ“ Brewington (born 1939) was a professional American football player. He played for the Oakland Raiders of the American Football League during the 1961 AFL season.

References

Sportspeople from Greenville, North Carolina
Players of American football from North Carolina
Oakland Raiders players
North Carolina Central Eagles football players
1939 births
2012 deaths
American football offensive tackles
American Football League players